Hagenbach is a Verbandsgemeinde ("collective municipality") in the district of Germersheim, Rhineland-Palatinate, Germany. The seat of the Verbandsgemeinde is in Hagenbach.

The Verbandsgemeinde Hagenbach consists of the following Ortsgemeinden ("local municipalities"):

 Berg
 Hagenbach
 Neuburg am Rhein
 Scheibenhardt

Verbandsgemeinde in Rhineland-Palatinate